Death on the Nile is a novel by Agatha Christie published in 1937.

Death on the Nile may also refer to:
 Death on the Nile (1978 film), film based on the novel, directed by John Guillermin.
 "Death on the Nile", 2004 episode of the ITV series Agatha Christie's Poirot.
 Death on the Nile (2022 film), film based on the novel, directed by Kenneth Branagh.
 Death on the Nile (short story), unrelated 1934 short story by Agatha Christie.

See also
 "Death on Denial", third episode of the 2022 second season of Chucky.